The men's welterweight event was part of the boxing programme at the 1920 Summer Olympics.  The weight class was the fourth-heaviest contested, and allowed boxers of up to 147 pounds (66.7 kilograms). The competition was held from August 21, 1920 to August 24, 1920. 18 boxers from ten nations competed.

The gold medal bout between Bert Schneider and Alexander Ireland ended in a draw, but the referee ordered the exhausted boxers to fight an extra round.

Results

References

Sources
 
 

Welterweight